Neil Douglas McKenzie (born 24 November 1975) is a South African former cricketer, who played all three forms of the game. He was a right-handed opening batsman who played for South Africa, making his first appearance in 2000. He is currently the high performance batting coach of South Africa. He played for the Highveld Lions in South African domestic cricket and has also played county cricket for Somerset, Durham and Hampshire.

He announced his retirement from all forms of cricket in January 2016.

Early and personal life
Educated at King Edward VII School, McKenzie was a promising junior cricketer, captaining the South African Schools and Under-19 sides. McKenzie is married to South African model Kerry McGregor. His sister, Megan, is also a leading model in South Africa.

Domestic career
With better form in international arena, a further development as a result of his recall was that Somerset announced that it was unlikely that McKenzie would return to the club for the 2008 season, having played in 2007 as a Kolpak player. It was subsequently announced that he would play part of the 2008 season for Durham as an overseas player.

In January 2010, McKenzie joined English county side Hampshire as a Kolpak player for the 2010 County Championship. On 5 August 2011 McKenzie hit his career best first-class score of 237 in a County Championship match against Yorkshire. Not only did he make his highest score, but during his innings a number of records fell. Himself and Michael Carberry set a new Hampshire record for the 3rd wicket in first-class cricket, setting a partnership of 523 runs to surpass the previous best partnership for the 3rd wicket, which was set by George Brown and Phil Mead in 1927. The partnership with Carberry was also the highest for any wicket for Hampshire, surpassing the 411 set by Robert Poore and Teddy Wynyard in 1899. Their partnership was the 11th time in first-class cricket that a partnership has passed 500 runs, currently ranks 9th on the all-time list.

International career
His Test debut came as an opening batsman in a tour of Sri Lanka but like his father Kevin McKenzie he soon cemented his place in the South African middle order before returning to the side as an opener later in his career. McKenzie made his maiden Test hundred against New Zealand in 2000–01. Another century soon came, against Sri Lanka at Supersport Park but it would be his last for seven years. From there on in he could not convert his twelve 50s into hundreds although he came close when he was run out by Damien Martyn for 99. After a series of low scores was dropped from the side. After showing excellent form in domestic cricket, and due to successive poor performances by opener Herschelle Gibbs, he was recalled to the South African Test squad three and a half years later for the second Test against the West Indies at Newlands. Opening the innings, McKenzie scored 23 before a torn calf muscle meant he was unable to bat in the second innings and would miss the third Test of the series.

During a test against Bangladesh begun on 29 February 2008, McKenzie was involved in a world record 1st wicket partnership of 415 with Graeme Smith, McKenzie registering a career best 226. He continued his form in the next Test against India when he registered scores of 94 and 155 not out.

In the first Test against England at Lord's in July 2008, McKenzie batted for over nine hours in a 447-ball innings of 138 to help his side save the match having been asked to follow-on on the third day.

During 2008, McKenzie became one of only twelve players to score more than 1000 test runs in the calendar year. The year, however, ended in disappointing fashion as he was shown to be out of form in series against Bangladesh and Australia. That then led to him being dropped from the test squad, after the second test.

He played his first ODI since 2003 against Australia and made a hard-fought 63 in the first ODI, while also playing his part in a successful 4–1 series win, which made South Africa the number 1 ranked ODI team in the world. With Graeme Smith fit again, McKenzie lost his place in the next ODI squad.

He was however named as one of five cricketers of the year by Wisden, a prestigious award, dating back more than 125 years, for his form in the away series in England.

International centuries

Test centuries

ODI centuries

International awards

One Day International Cricket

Man of the Match awards

References

External links

Cricinfo player profile

1975 births
Alumni of King Edward VII School (Johannesburg)
Barbados Royals cricketers
Cricketers from Johannesburg
Durham cricketers
Gauteng cricketers
Hampshire cricketers
Lions cricketers
Living people
Northerns cricketers
Somerset cricketers
South African cricket coaches
South African cricketers
South Africa One Day International cricketers
South Africa Test cricketers
South Africa Twenty20 International cricketers
Wisden Cricketers of the Year